McClimansville is an unincorporated community in Pleasant Township, Madison County, Ohio, United States.

References 

Unincorporated communities in Madison County, Ohio
Unincorporated communities in Ohio